This is a list of monarchs of Korea, arranged by dynasty. Names are romanized according to the South Korean Revised Romanization of Korean. McCune–Reischauer romanizations may be found at the articles about the individual monarchs.

Gojoseon
Gojoseon (2333 BC – 108 BC) was the first Korean kingdom. According to legend, it was founded by Dangun in 2333 BC.

Bronze Age archaeological evidence of Gojoseon culture is found in northern Korea and Liaoning. By the 9th to 4th century BC, various historical and archaeological evidence shows Gojoseon was a flourishing state and a self-declared kingdom.

Both Dangun and Gija are believed to be mythological figures, but recent findings suggest and theorize that since Gojoseon was a kingdom with artifacts dating back to the 4th millennium BC, Dangun and Gija may have been royal or imperial titles used for the monarchs of Gojoseon, hence the use of Dangun for 1900 years.

Earliest mythological rulers

Historical rulers

Buyeo
Buyeo (c. 2nd century BC – 494 AD) ruled in modern-day Northeast China. Although records are sparse and contradictory, it is speculated that in the 1st century BC, Eastern Buyeo branched out, after which the original Buyeo is sometimes referred to as Northern Buyeo. Its remnants were absorbed by the neighboring and brotherhood kingdom of Goguryeo in 494.

Early Eastern Buyeo

Galsa Buyeo

Later Northern Buyeo

Goguryeo
Goguryeo (37 BC – 668 AD) was one of the Three Kingdoms of Korea. Goguryeo rulers may have used the title of Taewang (太王, "Greatest King").

Baekje
Baekje (18 BC – 660 AD) was one of the Three Kingdoms of Korea. Temple names were the same as personal names, unless noted otherwise.

Silla
Silla (57 BC – 935 AD) was one of the Three Kingdoms of Korea. In the early years, Silla was ruled by the Pak, Seok, and Kim families. Rulers of Silla had various titles, including Isageum, Maripgan, and Daewang. Like some Baekje kings, some declared themselves emperor.

Hyeokgeose Geoseogan 혁거세 거서간 赫居世居西干 (57 BC – 4 AD)
Namhae Chachaung 남해 차차웅 南解次次雄 (4–24)
Yuri Isageum 유리이사금 儒理尼師今 (24–57) (Kings Yuri to Heurhae bore the Korean title Isageum, an old word for "ruler")
Talhae Isageum 탈해이사금 脫解尼師今 (57–80)
Pasa Isageum 파사이사금 婆娑尼師今 (80–112)
Jima Isageum 지마이사금 祇摩尼師今 (112–134)
Ilseong Isageum 일성이사금 逸聖尼師今 (134–154)
Adalla Isageum 아달라이사금 阿達羅尼師今 (154–184)
Beolhyu Isageum 벌휴이사금 伐休尼師今 (184–196)
Naehae Isageum 내해이사금 奈解尼師今 (196–230)
Jobun Isageum 조분이사금 助賁尼師今 (230–247)
Cheomhae Isageum 첨해이사금 沾解尼師今 (247–261)
Michu Isageum 미추이사금 味鄒尼師今 (262–284)
Yurye Isageum 유례이사금 儒禮尼師今 (284–298)
Girim Isageum 기림이사금 基臨尼師今 (298–310)
Heulhae Isageum 흘해이사금 訖解尼師今 (310–356)
Naemul Maripgan 내물마립간 奈勿麻立干 (356–402) (Kings Naemul to Soji bore the Korean title Maripgan, an old word for "ruler")
Silseong Maripgan 실성마립간 實聖麻立干 (402–417)
Nulji Maripgan 눌지마립간 訥祇麻立干 (417–458)
Jabi Maripgan 자비마립간 慈悲麻立干 (458–479)
Soji Maripgan 소지마립간 炤知麻立干 (479–500)
King Jijeung 지증왕 智證王 (500–514) (Kings Jijeung to Gyeongsun bore the title Wang (the modern Korean word for "king"), with the exceptions noted below)
King Beopheung 법흥왕 法興王 (514–540)
King Jinheung 진흥왕 眞興王 (540–576)
King Jinji 진지왕 眞智王 (576–579)
King Jinpyeong 진평왕 眞平王 (579–632)
Queen Seondeok 선덕여왕 善德王 (632–647)
Queen Jindeok 진덕여왕 眞德王 (647–654)
King Taejong Muyeol 태종무열왕 太宗武烈王 (654–661)
King Munmu 문무왕 文武王 (661–681)
King Sinmun 신문왕 神文王 (681–692)
King Hyoso 효소왕 孝昭王 (692–702)
King Seongdeok 성덕왕 聖德王 (702–737)
King Hyoseong 효성왕 孝成王 (737–742)
King Gyeongdeok 경덕왕 景德王 (742–765)
King Hyegong 혜공왕 惠恭王 (765–780)
King Seondeok 선덕왕 宣德王 (780–785)
King Wonseong 원성왕 元聖王 (785–798)
King Soseong 소성왕 昭聖王 (798–800)
King Aejang 애장왕 哀莊王 (800–809)
King Heondeok 헌덕왕 憲德王 (809–826)
King Heungdeok 흥덕왕 興德王 (826–836)
King Huigang 희강왕 僖康王 (836–838)
King Minae 민애왕 閔哀王 (838–839)
King Sinmu 신무왕 神武王 (839)
King Munseong 문성왕 文聖王 (839–857)
King Heonan 헌안왕 憲安王 (857–861)
King Gyeongmun 경문왕 景文王 (861–875)
King Heongang 헌강왕 憲康王 (875–886)
King Jeonggang 정강왕 定康王 (886–887)
Queen Jinseong 진성여왕 眞聖王 (887–897)
King Hyogong 효공왕 孝恭王 (897–912)
King Sindeok 신덕왕 神德王 (912–917)
King Gyeongmyeong 경명왕 景明王 (917–924)
King Gyeongae 경애왕 景哀王 (924–927)
King Gyeongsun 경순왕 敬順王 (927–935)

Gaya confederacy
The Gaya confederacy (42–562) consisted of several small statelets. All rulers of Gaya bore the title Wang ("King").

Geumgwan Gaya
Geumgwan Gaya (42–532) was one of the Gaya confederacy.

Daegaya
Daegaya (42–562) was one of the Gaya confederacy.

Tamna

Tamna (2337 BC(?)–938 AD) was an ancient local kingdom on the Jeju Island.

Balhae

Balhae (698–926) was an ancient Korean kingdom established after the fall of Goguryeo. Balhae occupied southern parts of Northeast China, Primorsky Krai, and the northern part of the Korean peninsula.

Later Baekje 
Later Baekje (900–936) was founded by Gyeon Hwon, who was a general during Later Silla's period of decline. Thus began the Later Three Kingdoms period. Later Baekje met its downfall at the hands of Gyeon Hwon himself, who later led the Goryeo armies alongside Taejo of Goryeo to capture Singeom, the prince of Later Baekje, who had betrayed Gyeon Hwon.

Later Goguryeo 
Taebong (901–918), also known as Majin or Later Goguryeo, was established by Gung-ye, an outcast prince of Silla. Gung-Ye joined General Yang Gil's rebellion, and rose through the ranks. He eventually assassinated Yang-Gil and established a new kingdom, naming it Later Goguryeo. Gung-Ye turned out to be a tyrant, and was overthrown by his generals, opening the way for General Wang Geon, who established Goryeo.

Goryeo dynasty
Goryeo (918–1392) was ruled by the Wang Dynasty.  The first ruler had the temple name Taejo, which means "great progenitor", and was applied to the first kings of both Goryeo and Joseon, as they were also the founders of the Wang and Yi Dynasties respectively. Starting with Gwangjong, rulers of Goryeo styled themselves emperors, with the first three rulers elevated to that title posthumously. With the Mongol conquest, however, the title of the ruler was demoted to a king, or "Wang."

The next twenty-three kings (until Wonjong) are also referred to by their temple names, ending in jong. Beginning with Chungnyeol (the twenty-fifth king), all the remaining kings of Goryeo had the title Wang ("King") as part of their temple names. Era names are in bracket where available.

Joseon dynasty

Joseon (1392–1910) followed Goryeo. In 1897, when Joseon became the Korean Empire, some of the Joseon kings were posthumously raised to the rank of emperors.

Joseon monarchs had temple names ending in jo or jong. Jo was given to the first kings/emperors of new lines within the dynasty, with the first king/emperor having the special name (Taejo), which means "great progenitor" (see also Goryeo).  Jong was given to all other kings/emperors.

Two kings, Yeonsangun and Gwanghaegun, were not given temple names after their reigns ended.

Each monarch had a posthumous name that included either the title Wang ("King"), Hwangje ("Emperor"), Daewang ("King X the Great"), or Daeje ("Emperor X the Great").  For the sake of consistency, the title "King/Emperor" has been added to each monarch's temple name in the list below.

* see Korean Empire section

Korean Empire 
In 1897, King Gojong proclaimed Joseon to be the Korean Empire, which lasted until 1910. Technically, the emperors can be referred to by their era names rather than their temple names, but the latter are commonly used.

See also
 Family tree of Korean monarchs
 List of Mahan confederacy monarchs
 Prime Minister of the Korean Empire (1895–1910)
 Resident-General of Korea, List of Japanese residents-general of Korea (1905–1910)
 Governor-General of Chōsen, List of Japanese governors-general of Korea (1910–1945)
 Provisional Government of the Republic of Korea, List of presidents (1919–1948)
 North Korea (1948–present), Supreme Leader (North Korean title) / List of heads of state of North Korea
 South Korea (1948–present), List of presidents of South Korea

Notes

References

https://web.archive.org/web/20031006023320/http://www.rootsinfo.co.kr/index_sub02.html (in Korean only)
http://www.rulers.org

Monarchs